Masarygus is a genus of hoverflies native to Argentina, containing two species. It was first described as representing a new family related to Conopidae or possibly the Oestridae due to its much reduced mouthparts. Larvae are found in ant nests.

Species
M. palmipalpus Reemer, 2013
M. planifrons Bréthes, 1909

References

Hoverfly genera
Microdontinae
Diptera of South America